Pendharkar is a family name that may be found in Marathi Brahmin families.

History
A small village called 'Pendhari' is the original place of all Pendharkars. Pendhari is in Sindhudurg district of Maharashtra. It is a place 10–12 km from Talere. State Transport buses going to Kharepatan or Vijaydurg go via Talere.

'Sthaneshwar Mahadev' and Goddess 'Mahalakshmi' of Kolhapur are the family gods of Pendharkars.

Notable people with this name

 Baburao Pendharkar, actor
 Bhalchandra Pendharkar, actor
 Bhalji Pendharkar, film director
 Prabhakar Pendharkar, writer
 Yashwant Dinkar Pendharkar, poet and writer

References

Social groups of Maharashtra
Indian surnames